Cristina Rodrigues may refer to:

Cristina Rodrigues (politician) (born 1985), Portuguese politician

See also
Cristina Rodríguez (disambiguation)